The following is a list of presidents of Konkuk University:

References 

Presidents
Konkuk University
Konkuk University